Huang Hua (1913–2010) was a foreign minister of China.

Huang Hua may also refer to:
Huang Hua (military leader) (1911–1943), military leader of the Chinese Communist Party; the city of Huanghua in Hebei Province is named after him
Huang Hua (activist) (born 1939), Taiwanese independence activist
Huang Hua (badminton) (born 1969), female Chinese badminton player

See also
Huanghua (disambiguation)